The Sierra Crest is a roughly  generally north-to-south ridgeline that demarcates the broad west and narrow east slopes of the Sierra Nevada and that extends as far east as the Sierra's topographic front (e.g., Diamond Mountains and Sierran escarpment). The Sierra Crest also forms two paths (bifurcates) around endorheic cirques (e.g., Cup Lake) between the west and east Sierra slopes.

Theodore Solomons made the first attempt to map a crest route along the Sierras.  He was instrumental in envisioning, exploring, and establishing the route of what became the John Muir Trail from Yosemite Valley along the crest of the Sierra Nevada to Mount Whitney.

References

Landforms of the Sierra Nevada (United States)
Landforms of Tulare County, California
Ridges of California
Landforms of Kern County, California
Landforms of Lassen County, California
Landforms of Fresno County, California
Landforms of Inyo County, California
Landforms of Madera County, California
Landforms of Plumas County, California
Landforms of Mono County, California